The Pisan Cross is the symbol of the northern Italian city of Pisa and its predecessor state, the sovereign maritime Republic of Pisa. was the coat of arms of the people of Pisa, granted to them by Pope Benedict VIII to fight Saracens in Sardinia in 1017.

Description 
The Pisan cross is technically described as with keys (or paws) and three spheres on every arm.  Its symbolism is unknown; the cross itself may represent Christ, and the twelve spheres his Apostles.

History 
Although the Pisan cross itself dates to 1017, the oldest surviving representation is a carving on the city walls, built in 1156 by counsellor Cocco Griffi. The city flag, red with the white cross on it, was officially recognized by Pope Callixtus II. The previous flag of Pisa was a plain field of vermillion, derived from the flag of Imperial Rome.

Modern usage 
Today, the cross remains a symbol of the city. A red shield with the cross on it is the official arms of the Comune of Pisa. It also appears in the lower-right quarter of the ensign and coat-of-arms of the Italian Navy, which combines it with the emblems of the other medieval Maritime Republics: Venice, Genoa and Amalfi.

Gallery 

Pisa
Religious symbols
1017 establishments in Europe
11th-century establishments in Italy
Italian coats of arms
Cross symbols
Crosses in heraldry
Republic of Pisa